The Cooper 416 is a Canadian sailboat that was designed by Stan Huntingford as a cruiser and first built in 1978.

The design was developed into the US Yachts US 42 in 1982 when the moulds were sold to Bayliner.

Production
The design was built by Cooper Enterprises in Port Coquitlam, British Columbia, starting in 1978, but it is now out of production.

Design
The Cooper 416 is a recreational keelboat, built predominantly of fibreglass, with wood trim. The design goals included comfortable accommodations and good sailing qualities.

The boat has a masthead sloop rig; a raked stem; a raised counter, reverse transom; a skeg-mounted rudder controlled by a wheel and a fixed fin keel. It displaces  and carries  of lead ballast.

The design has sleeping accommodation for eight people, with a double "V"-berth in the bow cabin, a "U"-shaped settee and a straight settee in the main cabin and an aft cabin with a double berth on the starboard side and a single quarter berth on the port side. The galley is located on the starboard side amidships. The galley is "U"-shaped and is equipped with a four-burner stove, an ice box and a double sink. A navigation station is opposite the galley, on the port side. The head is located just aft of the bow cabin on the starboard side and includes a shower.

For sailing downwind the design may be equipped with a symmetrical spinnaker.

See also
List of sailing boat types

Related development
Cooper 353
US Yachts US 42

References

External links
Cooper 416 photos

Keelboats
1970s sailboat type designs
Sailing yachts
Sailboat type designs by Stan Huntingford
Sailboat types built by Cooper Enterprises